The 2008 season was Santos Futebol Clube's ninety-sixth in existence and the club's forty-ninth consecutive season in the top flight of Brazilian football.

On 15 December 2007, Santos appointed Emerson Leão to coach the team for the third time. This was after the dismissal of Vanderlei Luxemburgo at the end of 2007 season. Later, Leão was fired due to bad results and for his place Cuca was signed. Cuca also didn't get good results and was fired on 7 August, replaced by Márcio Fernandes, who assumed the team as caretaker until the end of season.

Unlike the last two seasons, Santos did not get the Campeonato Paulista title, reaching the 7th position.
Their Campeonato Brasileiro campaign was the worst of history, where they were almost relegated, ending in the 15th position, out of 20 teams. Santos advanced to quarter-finals of Copa Libertadores, but were eliminated by Mexican side Club América after a 1–2 aggregate loss.

Players

Squad information

Appearances and goals

Source: Match reports in Competitive matches

Top scorers

Source: Match reports in Competitive matches

Disciplinary record

Source: Match reports in Competitive matches

Kit

The kits for the 2008 season were revealed on 3 March 2008 bearing the Semp Toshiba logo. The main novelty was the third shirt, with navy blue, based on the first model used by the club in 1912.

Transfers

In

Out

Out on loan

Competitions

Overall summary

Detailed overall summary
{|class="wikitable" style="text-align: center;"
|-
!
!Total
! Home
! Away
|-
|align=left| Games played          || 67 || 34 || 33
|-
|align=left| Games won             || 26 || 21 || 5
|-
|align=left| Games drawn           || 17 || 8 || 9
|-
|align=left| Games lost            || 24 || 5 || 19
|-
|align=left| Biggest win           || 7–0 v San José || 7–0 v San José || 2–0 v Cúcuta
|-
|align=left| Biggest loss          || 1–5 v Coritiba || 0–4 v Goiás || 1–5 v Coritiba
|-
|align=left| Clean sheets          || 25 || 15 || 10
|-
|align=left| Goals scored          || 90 || 67 || 23
|-
|align=left| Goals conceded        || 84 || 32 || 52
|-
|align=left| Goal difference       || +6 || +35 || -29
|-
|-
|-
|align=left| Most appearances     || Kléber Pereira (60) || – || –
|-
|align=left| Top scorer          || Kléber Pereira (40) || – || –
|-
|align=left| Worst discipline      || Domingos  (17)  (3) || – || –
|-
|align=left| Points               || 95/201 (%) || 71/102 (%) ||24/99 (%)
|-
|align=left| Winning rate         || (%) || (%) || (%)
|-

Campeonato Brasileiro

League table

Results summary

Results by round

Matches

Campeonato Paulista

Results summary

First stage

League table

Matches

Copa Libertadores

Group stage

Knockout stage

Round of 16

Quarter-finals

References

Santos
2008